Dedengita is a place within Darfur in Sudan. It is a military training camp. Another military training camp in the area is at Guedera. It is about 25 km from the village of 
Meramta.

See also Darfur

External links
Amnesty International on camps in Sudan

Geography of Sudan
Darfur